is a Japanese cartoonist and independent filmmaker. An influential figure in Japanese independent animation, he was the unofficial leader and most prolific of the  collective who kick-started the renaissance of modern-styled, independently made, adult-aimed animation in early 1960s Japan. He is known internationally for the very black comedy of his films, with the typically naïve style of his cartooning often belying the surreal, obscene and disturbing situations they depict (though he has worked in a variety of styles and mediums, including pixilation); this made them a favourite among the fervently counter-cultural audiences, which included such filmmakers as René Laloux, of the first few years of the Annecy International Animated Film Festival, and in a 1967 publication he was considered to be "the most significant" and "the only Japanese animator whose work is known in the West" (which is to disregard the Tōei Animation features and Astro Boy series that were first seen in the West around the same time that Kuri's first several films were and mentioned in passing in the same publication, though these were not known as works of an individual and characteristic filmmaker and often had their Japanese origin played down). He is also known in Japan for his comics, a collection of which earned him the 1958 Bungeishunjū Manga Award. In 2012 he received a Lifetime Achievement Award at the World Festival of Animated Film - Animafest Zagreb.

Selected filmography
Kuri made over 40 short films between 1960 and 1981; some of the best known are:
 (1960)
 (1962)
 (1962)
 (1963)
 (1963)
The Button (1963)
 (1964)
 (1963)
 (1964)
 (1965)
 (1965)
 (1965)

Permanent Exhibition
 Manabe Museum 1 Chome-9-20 Chosenjicho Sabae, Fukui.  Near Nishiyama-Kōen Station of Fukui Railway.
 Tannan Regional Medical Center 1 Chome-2-31 Sanrokucho Sabae, Fukui. Near Shinmei Station of Fukui Railway.
 Gallery K Yoji Kuri No Sekai (The World of Yoji Kuri) 16-18 Tadasucho, Sabae, Fukui.  About 20 min walk from Shinmei Station of Fukui Railway.

See also
Cinema of Japan
History of anime

References

Further reading
 Douglass, Jason Cody. "In Search of a 'New Wind': Experimental, Labor Intensive, and Intermedial Animation in 1950s and 60s Japan." Animation Studies Online Journal, 2019.

External links
 Extracts from Kuri's films at New Animation Animation 
 Love by Yōji Kuri and AOS and The Bathroom by Yōji Kuri at Cartoon Brew
  

1928 births
Anime character designers
Anime directors
Japanese animators
Japanese animated film directors
Japanese surrealist artists
Living people
Manga artists
Black comedy